The women's petanque precision shooting competition in boules sports at the 2022 World Games took place on 12 July 2022 at the University of Alabama Birmingham in Birmingham, United States.

Competition format
A total of 8 athletes entered the competition. Top 4 athletes from qualification advances to semifinals.

Results

Qualification

Finals

References